Jordan Lane Price is an American actress, singer and model. She is best known for her portrayal of Celia Fitzgerald in The Online Network reboot of soap opera drama series All My Children.

Early life
When Price was eight years old, she began musical theater, which eventually led her to start working in professional theater. She studied philosophy in college.

Career
Price portrayed Celia Fitzgerald in The Online Network reboot of soap opera drama series All My Children. It was originally reported Price was cast in the role of an aged Miranda Montgomery, however she would portray a new character of Celia Fitzgerald, and that the role of Miranda would be played by Denyse Tontz. Price first appeared in the contract role when the series premiered on April 29, 2013. Her performance as the character were well received by critics.

Her debut extended play (EP), Sponge will be released on June 30 from Innit Recordings. It was composed entirely by singer-songwriter and producer James Levy, mixed at The Rumpus Room and mastered by Joe LaPorta at Sterling Sound. The lead single, "These Days" was positively received by critics as a "timeless piece of pop perfect" while also pointing out the "60s-inspired vibe and Price's fuzzed out vocals add to the track's winsome, retro feel". The second single, title track "Sponge", was also positively received by critics as a "tune resplendent in beats to march to and Lane Price's honeyed tones layered and lightly reverbed".

Filmography

Discography

Extended plays
Sponge (2015)

References

External links

1989 births
Living people
American female models
American soap opera actresses
People from Los Angeles
21st-century American singers
21st-century American women singers